The 1954 South Dakota gubernatorial election was held on November 2, 1954.

Incumbent Republican Governor Sigurd Anderson was term-limited.

Republican nominee Joe Foss defeated Democratic nominee Ed C. Martin with 56.67% of the vote.

Primary elections
Primary elections were held on June 1, 1954.

Democratic primary

Candidates
Ernest F. McKellips, former mayor of Alcester
Ed C. Martin, rancher

Results

Republican primary

Candidates
Joe Foss, unsuccessful candidate for Republican nomination for Governor in 1950
Harold O. Lund, Chairman of the Board of Charities and Corrections
Rex Terry, incumbent Lieutenant Governor

Results

General election

Candidates
Ed C. Martin, Democratic
Joe Foss, Republican

Results

References

Bibliography
 

1954
South Dakota
Gubernatorial
November 1954 events in the United States